Abdoul Yoda may refer to:
 Karim Yoda (Abdoul Karim Yoda, born 1988), French footballer
 Abdoul Yoda (footballer, born 2000), Burkinabé footballer